Abdalla Ali Mohamed (عبد الله علي محمد, born 26 August 1978) is an Egyptian male handball player. He was a member of the Egypt men's national handball team. He was a part of the  team at the 2004 Summer Olympics. On club level he played for Zamalek SC in Egypt.

References

1978 births
Living people
Egyptian male handball players
Handball players at the 2004 Summer Olympics
Olympic handball players of Egypt
Place of birth missing (living people)
21st-century Egyptian people